John Raymond Aspden (6 February 1938 – 24 August 2021) was an English professional footballer who played as a centre half.

Career
Born in Horwich, Aspden played for Bolton Wanderers and Rochdale. He played for Rochdale in the 1962 Football League Cup Final.

Aspen died on 24 August 2021.

References

1938 births
2021 deaths
English footballers
Bolton Wanderers F.C. players
Rochdale A.F.C. players
English Football League players
People from Horwich
Association football defenders